Crime and Punishment U.S.A. (1959) is an American feature film directed by Denis Sanders, written by Walter Newman and starring George Hamilton in his first screen role. The film was released on November 1, 1959.

The New York Times called the film "a beat generation version" of the novel Crime and Punishment by Fyodor Dostoyevsky. The film differs from the book in some of its plot elements and characterizations, and it takes place in contemporary Los Angeles rather than in 19th-century Russia.

Plot summary

A California law student murders a pawnbroker, then matches wits with the detective on the case.

Cast
 Mary Murphy as Sally
 Frank Silvera as Lieutenant Porter
 Marian Seldes as Debbie Cole
 John Harding as Fred Swanson
 Wayne Heffley as Rafe
 Eve McVeagh as Mrs. Griggs
 Tony Johnson as Mrs. Cole
 Lew Brown as Sergeant Neil Samuels
 George Hamilton as Robert
 Len Lesser as Desk Officer

Production
According to George Hamilton, director Denis Sanders "saw his project as a tragedy for the Beat Generation" and cast Hamilton because of his similarity to Tony Perkins.

The film was completed early in 1958 but was released more than one year later.

Reception
In a contemporary review for The New Republic, Stanley Kauffmann commented that "modern versions of classics are generally more clever than convincing because the very term 'classic' means a timeless work ... that need not be transplanted. ... [B]y reason of its attendant skills and an innocent, unpretentious earnestness of address, [the film] is a moderately interesting attempt to state the material of a vast symphony with a small jazz combination."

Roger Corman later said that the film "lost me a lot of money."

See also
 List of American films of 1959

References

External links
 Crime and Punishment U.S.A. at IMDB
 
 
 

1959 films
1959 crime drama films
Allied Artists films
American black-and-white films
American crime drama films
Films based on Crime and Punishment
Films directed by Denis Sanders
Films scored by Herschel Burke Gilbert
Films set in Los Angeles
Films with screenplays by Walter Newman (screenwriter)
1950s English-language films
1950s American films